Sumikawa Station (澄川駅) is a rapid transit station in Minami-ku, Sapporo, Hokkaido, Japan. The station number is N14. It is one of the four Sapporo Municipal Subway stations located above-ground (all of them are at the south terminus of the Namboku Line).

Platforms

Surrounding area
Hokkaido Chuo Bus Terminal, Sumikawa
Sapporo Sumikawa Library
Sapporo Sumikawa-Ekimae Post Office
Police Station, Sumikawa South Post
Sapporo City Agricultural Cooperative Association(JA Sapporo), Sumikawa branch
Tenjin Mountain and Tenjinyama Art Studio
Hokkaido International School
Maxvalu Supermarket, Sumikawa
Hokkaido Bank, Sumikawa branch
North Pacific Bank, Sumikawa branch
Sapporo Shinkin Bank Sumikawa branch

External links

 Sapporo Subway Stations

 

Railway stations in Japan opened in 1971
Railway stations in Sapporo
Sapporo Municipal Subway
Minami-ku, Sapporo